John Patrick Varone (November 9, 1936 – October 11, 2011) was an American professional Canadian football player who played as a halfback and fullback, as well as a linebacker. Varone played for the Winnipeg Blue Bombers of the Canadian Football League from 1958 to 1959.

Career
A native of East Boston, Varone attended East Boston High School and graduated in 1954. He went on to play college football for the University of Miami Hurricanes from 1954 to 1957, under coach Andy Gustafson. The team had a winning record in all of the seasons that Varone played there, but did not win any bowl games.

Varone was selected in the fourth round of the 1958 NFL Draft as the 46th pick overall by the San Francisco 49ers, coached by Frankie Albert, but soon signed with the Winnipeg Blue Bombers of the Canadian Football League. In both of his seasons with the Blue Bombers under coach Bud Grant, the team won the Grey Cup. Varone played both on offense and defense as a halfback and linebacker in his first season, then transitioning from halfback to fullback in his second season. He would play in a total of 25 games, tallying 259 rushing yards, 158 receiving yards, 2 receiving touchdowns, and 2 interceptions.

Varone returned to Florida, where he played college football, and became a teacher in 1961 at Miami Norland Senior High School. He remained there until 1989.

A resident of Pembroke Pines and then Palm Bay, Varone died in Florida in 2011 at the age of seventy-three.

See also
1958 San Francisco 49ers season
List of Miami Hurricanes in the NFL draft
San Francisco 49ers draft history

References

External links
Pro Football Archives profile
Sun Sentinel obituary

1936 births
2011 deaths
People from East Boston, Boston
Players of American football from Massachusetts
Schoolteachers from Florida
American football running backs
Miami Hurricanes football players
American players of Canadian football
Canadian football running backs
Winnipeg Blue Bombers players